The 1974–75 Buffalo Braves season was the fifth season of the club in the National Basketball Association. It was the team's third season under head coach Jack Ramsay. The team's home arena was the Buffalo Memorial Auditorium, with six "home" games played at Maple Leaf Gardens in Toronto.

Despite losing three key players in Gar Heard, Jim McMillian and Ernie DiGregorio for long stretches, the Braves continued to improve. Buffalo finished second in the Atlantic Division to Boston, with a record of 49–33 and a .598 winning percentage; this would endure as the club's best record for 37 years, until the twice-relocated Los Angeles Clippers amassed a 40-26 mark (.606) in the 2011-12 season. Bob McAdoo captured the NBA MVP Award, leading the league with 34.5 points per game, while adding 14.1 rebounds per contest, fourth-best in the NBA.

In the 1975 NBA Playoffs, the Braves earned the franchise's second playoff berth, this time against the Washington Bullets. The series went to the full seven games, with Washington taking the deciding contest, 115–96, at home. After the season, the team was occupied with legal wrangling surrounding the departure of minority owner and general manager Eddie Donovan.

Offseason
On March 21, Braves general manager Eddie Donovan announced that he would resign effective April 1.  The resignation was controversial because there were rumors that he would return to work for his prior team, New York Knicks, but there were simultaneous rumors that the Knicks had unfairly tampered with Donovan while under contract with the Braves.  Upon the announced resignation, NBA Commissioner Walter Kennedy announced that the league would conduct a hearing on the matter.  The transition was complicated by Donovan's 5% ownership of the Braves. Incoming commissioner, Larry O'Brien announced an amicable settlement as one of his first orders of business.

NBA Draft

The following members of the 1974–75 Buffalo Braves were drafted during the 1974 NBA Draft.  McMillen played for a year in Europe before joining the 1975–76 Buffalo Braves.  He played for a team in Bologna, Italy.

Roster
{| class="toccolours" style="font-size: 95%; width: 100%;"
|-
! colspan="2" style="background:#106bb4; color:#fff; text-align:center;"| Buffalo Braves 1974-75 roster
|- style="background:#106bb4; color:#fff; text-align:center;"
! Players !! Coaches
|-
| valign="top" |
{| class="sortable" style="background:none; margin:0; width:100%;"
|-
! Pos. !! # !! Nat. !! Name !! Ht. !! Wt. !! From
|-

Roster Notes
 Forward Bernie Harris played in only 11 games before being waived in January.
 Guard Bob Weiss came back to the franchise as an assistant coach with the San Diego Clippers from 1978–80 and as a coach for the Los Angeles Clippers from 1993-94.

Regular season

Overview
An early eleven-game winning streak helped the Braves achieve a 16–4 record to start the season and a later seven-game streak took them to 31–16. Buffalo supplanted the New York Knicks as Boston's closest competitor in the Atlantic foursome with 49 wins and 33 losses. Buffalo boasted high-scoring super star Bob McAdoo, who posted a 34.5 scoring average to lead the NBA, while making more field goals than any other player. He also led in minutes played, while also ranking among the best rebounders and shot blockers in the league. McAdoo also earned 798 free throw tries, another league high, converting 81% of his attempts. The Braves lost reigning NBA Rookie of the Year Ernie DiGregorio to a knee injury that limited him to 31 games, watched former Laker Jim McMillian battle illness that caused him to miss 20 games, and also lost Gar Heard for 15 games, which dropped the team from the elite and put more of the load on their star. The Braves attendance increased by 40,000 to 467,267 in their 41 home games, but the team fell to 5th of 18 teams.  The team defense improved sufficiently to create an average 2.2-point scoring margin after a slight average deficit the year before.

McMillian ranked tenth in the league in field goal percentage. Heard ranked 9th in blocks per game (1.8). Jack Marin, who played in 81 games, ranked seventh in free throw percentage (86.9%). Randy Smith, who played in all 82 regular-season games for the third consecutive season, finished fourth in assists per game (6.5). McAdoo, who also played all 82 games, led the NBA in minutes played, field goals, rebounds (ranked fourth per game), points, and points per game.  Meanwhile, he ranked sixth in blocks per game, second in total free throws, and fifth in field goal percentage. This performance earned him the league MVP and first team All-NBA honors.

October–November
As he had the season before, DiGregorio had a tremendous opening night with 33 points. The Braves defeated the defending champion Boston Celtics 126–119, giving them their first win in nine games against Boston as a visitor. The Celtics had eliminated the Braves from the 1975 NBA Playoffs. DiGregorio was sidelined after six games due to knee surgery. After a 4–3 start, the Braves won eleven in a row starting with a November 3, 1974, victory over the Los Angeles Lakers at the Los Angeles Forum and culminating with a November 23 victory over the Phoenix Suns at home. In order to win the eighth game of the streak, the Braves had to overcome a seventeen-point deficit to earn a 111–106 victory against the Golden State Warriors. Even after losing to the Chicago Bulls on November 24, their 15–4 record was the best in the NBA.

December–January
During December, the Braves dealt with injuries to McMillan, who required an emergency appendectomy, and DiGregorio.  After their great start, the Braves compiled a 6–7 month of December.  On December 19, despite 49 points by McAdoo, the Braves lost to the Cleveland Cavaliers. On December 28, the NBA's smallest player, Calvin Murphy scored a career-high 45 points to lead the Houston Rockets to a 125–117 victory over Buffalo. By January, Heard was suffering from a knee injury. As a result, in some games, the Braves only played seven players. In a January 3 game against the Detroit Pistons, Dale Schlueter was involved in two altercations that resulted in bench-clearing brawls. In January 1975, the Braves recorded a seven-game winning streak starting with a January 10 win over the Cavaliers and ending with a January 24 victory over the New York Knicks. In the fifth game of the streak, McAdoo outscored Pete Maravich 43–40 at New Orleans.

February–April
Following an 11–4 January, the Braves struggled to a 7–7 record in February. On January 24, DiGregorio returned to the active roster following his October 29 knee cartilage injury. The March 13 victory against the Golden State Warriors established the franchise record for most wins in a season at 43, surpassing the prior season's total of 42. From March 14 to March 21, the Braves posted their season-worst four-game losing streak. Donovan announced his April 1 resignation in late March. In late March, DiGregorio was sidelined for the rest of the season. The Braves then went on a five-game winning streak from March 22 to March 29, but the team lost three of four April regular-season games.

Season standings

Record vs. opponents

Season schedule

|- bgcolor="bbffbb"
| 1||October 18 ||@ Boston Celtics || 126–119||1–0||Win 1
|- bgcolor="ffcccc"
| 2||October 19 ||Boston Celtics || 95–113||1–1||Loss 1
|- bgcolor="bbffbb"
| 3||October 22 ||New Orleans Jazz || 134–118||2–1||Win 1
|- bgcolor="bbffbb"
| 4||October 24 ||New York Knicks (at Toronto, Canada)|| 111–91||3–1||Win 2
|- bgcolor="bbffbb"
| 5||October 26 ||Chicago Bulls || 105–104||4–1||Win 3
|- bgcolor="ffcccc"
| 6||October 29 ||@ Golden State Warriors || 101–130||4–2||Loss 1
|-

|- bgcolor="ffcccc"
| 7||November 1 ||@ Portland Trail Blazers || 106–113||4–3||Loss 2
|- bgcolor="bbffbb"
| 8||November 3 ||@ Los Angeles Lakers || 124–101||5–3||Win 1
|- bgcolor="bbffbb"
| 9||November 6 ||@ New Orleans Jazz || 110–98||6–3||Win 2
|- bgcolor="bbffbb"
| 10||November 9 ||Detroit Pistons || 109–100||7–3||Win 3
|- bgcolor="bbffbb"
| 11||November 10 ||@ Detroit Pistons || 124–117||8–3||Win 4
|- bgcolor="bbffbb"
| 12||November 12 ||Cleveland Cavaliers || 112–94||9–3||Win 5
|- bgcolor="bbffbb"
| 13||November 14 ||@ Boston Celtics (at Providence, Rhode Island)|| 112–100||10–3||Win 6
|- bgcolor="bbffbb"
| 14||November 16 ||Kansas City-Omaha Kings || 101–96||11–3||Win 7
|- bgcolor="bbffbb"
| 15||November 19 ||Golden State Warriors || 111–106||12–3||Win 8
|- bgcolor="bbffbb"
| 16||November 20 ||@ Washington Bullets || 115–104||13–3||Win 9
|- bgcolor="bbffbb"
| 17||November 21 ||Philadelphia 76ers (at Toronto, Canada)|| 99–95||14–3||Win 10
|- bgcolor="bbffbb"
| 18||November 23 ||Phoenix Suns || 117–104||15–3||Win 11
|- bgcolor="ffcccc"
| 19||November 24 ||@ Chicago Bulls || 89–91||15–4||Loss 1
|- bgcolor="bbffbb"
| 20||November 26 ||@ Philadelphia 76ers || 103–99||16–4||Win 1
|- bgcolor="ffcccc"
| 21||November 29 ||Washington Bullets || 93–96||16–5||Loss 1
|- bgcolor="ffcccc"
| 22||November 30 ||@ New York Knicks || 111–118||16–6||Loss 2
|-

|- bgcolor="ffcccc"
| 23||December 3 ||Milwaukee Bucks || 101–110||16–7||Loss 3
|- bgcolor="bbffbb"
| 24||December 6 ||Portland Trail Blazers || 114–105||17–7||Win 1
|- bgcolor="ffcccc"
| 25||December 7 ||@ Philadelphia 76ers || 112–116||17–8||Loss 1
|- bgcolor="bbffbb"
| 26||December 10 ||Philadelphia 76ers || 101–91||18–8||Win 1
|- bgcolor="bbffbb"
| 27||December 12 ||Houston Rockets (at Toronto, Canada)|| 124–113||19–8||Win 2
|- bgcolor="bbffbb"
| 28||December 13 ||New York Knicks || 108–104||20–8||Win 3
|- bgcolor="bbffbb"
| 29||December 14 ||@ New York Knicks || 118–102||21–8||Win 4
|- bgcolor="ffcccc"
| 30||December 17 ||@ Kansas City-Omaha Kings || 110–111||21–9||Loss 1
|- bgcolor="ffcccc"
| 31||December 19 ||@ Cleveland Cavaliers || 104–106||21–10||Loss 2
|- bgcolor="ffcccc"
| 32||December 20 ||Atlanta Hawks || 102–113||21–11||Loss 3
|- bgcolor="bbffbb"
| 33||December 27 ||@ Phoenix Suns || 108–92||22–11||Win 1
|- bgcolor="ffcccc"
| 34||December 28 ||@ Houston Rockets || 117–125||22–12||Loss 1
|- bgcolor="ffcccc"
| 35||December 30 ||@ Milwaukee Bucks || 91–106||22–13||Loss 2
|-

|- bgcolor="ffcccc"
| 36||January 3 ||Detroit Pistons || 92–111||22–14||Loss 3
|- bgcolor="bbffbb"
| 37||January 4 ||@ Atlanta Hawks || 121–108||23–14||Win 1
|- bgcolor="ffcccc"
| 38||January 6 ||@ Philadelphia 76ers || 95–101||23–15||Loss 1
|- bgcolor="bbffbb"
| 39||January 7 ||Los Angeles Lakers || 115–107||24–15||Win 1
|- bgcolor="ffcccc"
| 40||January 9 ||Boston Celtics (at Toronto, Canada)|| 100–108||24–16||Loss 1
|- bgcolor="bbffbb"
| 41||January 10 ||Cleveland Cavaliers || 104–100||25–16||Win 1
|- bgcolor="bbffbb"
| 42||January 12 ||Boston Celtics || 114–101||26–16||Win 2
|- bgcolor="bbffbb"
| 43||January 17 ||Golden State Warriors || 121–116||27–16||Win 3
|- bgcolor="bbffbb"
| 44||January 18 ||@ Atlanta Hawks || 129–115||28–16||Win 4
|- bgcolor="bbffbb"
| 45||January 19 ||@ New Orleans Jazz || 117–112||29–16||Win 5
|- bgcolor="bbffbb"
| 46||January 21 ||Seattle SuperSonics || 118–108||30–16||Win 6
|- bgcolor="bbffbb"
| 47||January 24 ||New York Knicks || 105–99||31–16||Win 7
|- bgcolor="ffcccc"
| 48||January 26 ||@ Boston Celtics || 93–107||31–17||Loss 1
|- bgcolor="bbffbb"
| 49||January 30 ||@ Cleveland Cavaliers || 97–91||32–17||Win 1
|- bgcolor="bbffbb"
| 50||January 31 ||Atlanta Hawks || 111–101||33–17||Win 2
|-

|- bgcolor="ffcccc"
| 51||February 1 ||@ Detroit Pistons || 113–119||33–18||Loss 1
|- bgcolor="ffcccc"
| 52||February 4 ||Philadelphia 76ers || 105–111 (OT)||33–19||Loss 2
|- bgcolor="bbffbb"
| 53||February 7 ||Los Angeles Lakers || 108–98||34–19||Win 1
|- bgcolor="bbffbb"
| 54||February 9 ||@ Seattle SuperSonics || 99–93 (OT)||35–19||Win 2
|- bgcolor="bbffbb"
| 55||February 11 ||@ Los Angeles Lakers || 112–108||36–19||Win 3
|- bgcolor="ffcccc"
| 56||February 12 ||@ Phoenix Suns || 96–108||36–20||Loss 1
|- bgcolor="ffcccc"
| 57||February 14 ||Kansas City-Omaha Kings || 112–132||36–21||Loss 2
|- bgcolor="ffcccc"
| 58||February 16 ||@ Chicago Bulls || 109–114||36–22||Loss 3
|- bgcolor="bbffbb"
| 59||February 18 ||Phoenix Suns (at Toronto, Canada)|| 124–109||37–22||Win 1
|- bgcolor="bbffbb"
| 60||February 21 ||Portland Trail Blazers || 116–106||38–22||Win 2
|- bgcolor="bbffbb"
| 61||February 22 ||@ New York Knicks || 92–85||39–22||Win 3
|- bgcolor="ffcccc"
| 62||February 25 ||Washington Bullets || 93–111||39–23||Loss 1
|- bgcolor="bbffbb"
| 63||February 27 ||New Orleans Jazz (at Toronto, Canada)|| 110–100||40–23||Win 1
|- bgcolor="ffcccc"
| 64||February 28 ||New York Knicks || 106–114||40–24||Loss 1
|-

|- bgcolor="ffcccc"
| 65||March 1 ||@ Milwaukee Bucks || 100–104||40–25||Loss 2
|- bgcolor="bbffbb"
| 66||March 4 ||Seattle SuperSonics || 104–97||41–25||Win 1
|- bgcolor="ffcccc"
| 67||March 6 ||@ Kansas City-Omaha Kings || 110–111||41–26||Loss 1
|- bgcolor="bbffbb"
| 68||March 8 ||Milwaukee Bucks || 110–95||42–26||Win 1
|- bgcolor="bbffbb"
| 69||March 13 ||@ Golden State Warriors || 122–103||43–26||Win 2
|- bgcolor="ffcccc"
| 70||March 14 ||@ Seattle SuperSonics || 105–125||43–27||Loss 1
|- bgcolor="ffcccc"
| 71||March 16 ||@ Portland Trail Blazers || 95–102||43–28||Loss 2
|- bgcolor="ffcccc"
| 72||March 18 ||@ Houston Rockets || 115–122||43–29||Loss 3
|- bgcolor="ffcccc"
| 73||March 21 ||@ Boston Celtics || 101–109||43–30||Loss 4
|- bgcolor="bbffbb"
| 74||March 22 ||Houston Rockets || 117–112||44–30||Win 1
|- bgcolor="bbffbb"
| 75||March 25 ||Philadelphia 76ers || 118–103||45–30||Win 2
|- bgcolor="bbffbb"
| 76||March 26 ||@ Washington Bullets || 94–91||46–30||Win 3
|- bgcolor="bbffbb"
| 77||March 28 ||@ Philadelphia 76ers || 115–104||47–30||Win 4
|- bgcolor="bbffbb"
| 78||March 29 ||Boston Celtics || 102–96||48–30||Win 5
|-

|- bgcolor="ffcccc"
| 79||April 1 ||Chicago Bulls || 93–98||48–31||Loss 1
|- bgcolor="ffcccc"
| 80||April 2 ||@ Boston Celtics || 92–95||48–32||Loss 2
|- bgcolor="bbffbb"
| 81||April 4 ||Philadelphia 76ers || 108–97||49–32||Win 1
|- bgcolor="ffcccc"
| 82||April 6 ||@ New York Knicks || 93–105||49–33||Loss 1
|-

Playoffs
During the playoffs, the Braves captured home court advantage with a victory over the Washington Bullets in game 1 of the Eastern Conference Semifinals, but the Bullets returned the favor in game two. The home teams won the remaining games as Buffalo lost the series in seven games.  DiGregorio missed the playoffs. McAdoo played 46.7 minutes per game during the playoffs and averaged 37.4 points, which both led the league. Heard averaged 11.7 points and 10.9 rebounds.

During the regular season the Bullets had been 36–5 (which was an NBA single-season record for home victories) at home, but lost both games to the Braves.  The Braves then opened the series at the Capital Centre with a 113–102 victory in game 1. McAdoo was the game-high scorer with 35 and game-high rebounder with 14. The Bullets rebounded for a 120–106 victory in game 2 in Buffalo.  Wes Unseld totaled 25 rebounds and Elvin Hayes added 16 as well as 34 points. Meanwhile, McAdoo, who had averaged 14.1 rebounds during the regular season only had 6. In game 3, Phil Chenier scored 18 points in the third quarter as the Bullets expanded a 53–52 lead to 81–70.  Unseld had 18 rebounds and Hayes had 16 to go along with his 30 points.  McAdoo had a game-high 34 and Smith added 26 in a losing effort. Before game 4, McAdoo received his hardware for his league MVP and league scoring title and responded that night with a 50-point performance as the Braves evened the series 2–2 with a 108–102 victory.  Two nights later Hayes responded with 46 points, including 16 in the fourth quarter, as the Bullets completed a 97–93 comeback victory to regain the series lead 3–2.  In the game, the score was tied at 89 with two minutes left when Nick Weatherspoon hit a 17-foot jumper to give the Bullets the lead for good.  Chenier and Hayes built the lead up to 94–89 before McMillian made two short shots to bring the Braves back within 1 point in the final minute.  An Unseld offensive rebound and putback of a Hayes miss gave the Bullets crucial points in the final seconds.  On the night Hayes shot 19-for 26 and McAdoo countered with 34 points. In game 6, the Braves earned a 102–96 victory as McAdoo scored 9 of his 37 points in the final five minutes.  The game had 19 tie scores, with the last being at 89. In game 7, Washington jumped to a 28–13 lead after one quarter behind 14 points by Chenier.  Washington expanded the lead to 42–19 before closing the first half with a 56–38 lead. On the night, Chenier had a career-high 39 points in the 115–96 victory. McAdoo had 36 for Buffalo.

Playoff schedule

|- align="center" bgcolor="#ccffcc"
| 1
| April 10
| @ Washington
| W 113–102
| Bob McAdoo (35)
| Bob McAdoo (14)
| Randy Smith (9)
| Capital Centre17,140
| 1–0
|- align="center" bgcolor="#ffcccc"
| 2
| April 12
| Washington
| L 106–120
| Bob McAdoo (36)
| Gar Heard (10)
| Randy Smith (7)
| Buffalo Memorial Auditorium17,189
| 1–1
|- align="center" bgcolor="#ffcccc"
| 3
| April 16
| @ Washington
| L 96–111
| Bob McAdoo (34)
| Bob McAdoo (19)
| Randy Smith (7)
| Capital Centre19,035
| 1–2
|- align="center" bgcolor="#ccffcc"
| 4
| April 18
| Washington
| W 108–102
| Bob McAdoo (50)
| Bob McAdoo (21)
| Randy Smith (10)
| Buffalo Memorial Auditorium15,307
| 2–2
|- align="center" bgcolor="#ffcccc"
| 5
| April 20
| @ Washington
| L 93–97
| Bob McAdoo (34)
| Gar Heard (14)
| Heard, Smith (5)
| Capital Centre18,820
| 2–3
|- align="center" bgcolor="#ccffcc"
| 6
| April 23
| Washington
| W 102–96
| Bob McAdoo (37)
| Bob McAdoo (10)
| Smith, Weiss (7)
| Buffalo Memorial Auditorium15,172
| 3–3
|- align="center" bgcolor="#ffcccc"
| 7
| April 25
| @ Washington
| L 96–115
| Bob McAdoo (36)
| Gar Heard (14)
| Randy Smith (4)
| Capital Centre19,035
| 3–4
|-

Source: www.basketball-reference.com

Player stats

Awards and honors
 Bob McAdoo, NBA Most Valuable Player
 Bob McAdoo, NBA Scoring Champion
 Bob McAdoo All-NBA Team (1st team)
 Bob McAdoo 1975 NBA All-Star Game

Transactions
Prior to the season the team lost Bob Kauffman to the New Orleans Jazz in the May 20, 1974 NBA Expansion Draft.

On August 29, 1974, the Braves purchased Dale Schlueter from the Atlanta Hawks.  On September 4, 1974, Matt Guokas was traded along with a 1977 NBA Draft second round pick and a future second round draft pick to the Chicago Bulls for Bob Weiss. Bernie Harris was waived on January 20, 1975. Mike Macaluso did not return to play for the Braves and never played in the NBA again.

The Braves were involved in the following transactions during the 1974–75 season.

Trades

Free agents

Additions

Subtractions

References

External links
 Braves on Database Basketball
 Braves on Basketball Reference

Buffalo
Buffalo Braves seasons
Buffalo
Buffalo